Keith Ross may refer to:

 Ian Keith (Keith Ross, 1899–1960), American actor
 Keith Ross (surgeon) (1927–2003), British consultant cardiac surgeon
 Keith W. Ross, American scholar who researches computer networking and online social networks